Murder in Mind may refer to:

 Murder in Mind (album), a 1998 album by Desecration
 Murder in Mind (film), a 1997 American film
 Murder in Mind (TV series), a 2001–2003 British television series